The Scattering is the second studio album by the English new wave rock band Cutting Crew. It was released on 16 May 1989 in Canada and the USA on Virgin Records, and on 7 August 1989 in the United Kingdom on Siren Records. Despite including the US Adult Contemporary chart hit "Everything But My Pride", it met with little commercial or critical success.

Background 
In 1986, Cutting Crew had had a number-one US hit "(I Just) Died in Your Arms", the top 10 hit "I've Been in Love Before", and another Top 40 song, "One for the Mockingbird". All three were released to varying levels of chart success in their native UK and across much of Europe. However, their debut album, Broadcast, was less successful, failing to reach the top 10 in the US and the top 40 in the UK. Executives of Virgin Records were keen on the band delivering a follow-up album that both was popular on its own and had multiple radio-friendly singles lined up.

It was recorded mostly at Curtis Schwartz' Studio in Sussex, England, in 1988, the second-ever album ever to be recorded at the studio. It was set to be released the same year, but its release was delayed by a year due to seemingly managerial disputes, and it was finally released in early 1989.

Songs 
When asked during a December 2008 interview about his favorite track by Cutting Crew, vocalist Nick Van Eede spoke fondly of the album's title track, stating,

"The Scattering.' I think it's one of my best lyrics, telling of how the small villages in rural communities can die out when the life blood youth move away to the big cities. We had a lot of fun recording it as we flew down from Scotland with The Whistle Binkies who were a fabulous and famous folk band. We had 5 hours to record all their parts which included Bodhran, fiddle, pipes and accordion. This is still a firm favourite when we play live, even without the folk band!"

In a different interview, Van Eede talked about his frustrations with the continuous delaying of the album before its release, stating the song "(Between A) Rock and a Hard Place" had lyrics pertaining to the scenario.

“We wrote one slightly veiled song having a pop at US A&R antics in our 'Between a Rock and Hard Place' from The Scattering album. I sang, 'I got a brick but I can’t find a window,' as they continually blocked our albums release for months making us lose so much momentum.”

 Critical reception 

In positive review of May 27, 1989, David Spodek of RPM said that "the group have returned with a very strong follow-up" of prominent debut. As per him: "The quality of the material has improved, with their sound having a slightly harder edge to it." Spodek resumed: "this LP is sure to please those who enjoyed the group's first release, and should appeal to those who prefer something a little more filling than the average Top 40 fluff."

Michael Sutton of AllMusic wrote of the album, "...while The Scattering doesn't have ear candy like the band's hit singles, the music is less-blatantly commercial and more personal. It's still slick stuff -- big '80s synthesizers, glossy FM radio guitars, in-your-face drums -- but Nick Van Eede's vocals have a frosty glow that creates a mood and sustains interest." He ended his review saying, "The Scattering will probably seem dated to anyone who isn't an '80s enthusiast, but it's tasty nostalgia for people who remember the decade fondly. Cutting Crew were obviously infatuated with the arena-sized riffs of U2 and Big Country, and while the group doesn't reach those bands' creative heights, hook-packed material such as 'Everything but My Pride' and 'Tip of Your Tongue' finds them walking tall."

Chart performanceThe Scattering peaked at number 150 on the Billboard 200. Its singles also failed to make much impact, although "Everything But My Pride" reached number four on the AOR charts. The late release of the album is often blamed by the band as the primary reason for their stalling momentum and popularity; dissuaded by the commercial under-performance of the album and its singles, bassist Colin Farley and drummer Martin Beedle left the band.

Nick Van Eede and fellow guitarist and bandmate Kevin MacMichael continued, delivering one final Cutting Crew effort in October 1992, Compus Mentus''. The album failed to chart, and Cutting Crew disbanded in 1993.

 Track listing 

 Personnel Cutting Crew Nick Van Eede – lead vocals
 Kevin MacMichael – lead and rhythm guitars, backing vocals
 Colin Farley – bass guitar, backing vocals
 Martin Beetle – drums, percussion, backing vocalsAdditional personnel Peter-John Vettese – keyboards, sequencing, backing vocals 
 Stuart Eydmann – squeezebox (2)
 Mick Broderick – bodhrán (2)
 Mark Hayward – fiddle (2)
 Edward McGuire – flute (2)
 Rab Wallace – pipes (2)
 Danny Cummings – percussion (8)
 Ronnie Aspery – saxophone (9)
 Vladimir Pizowfski – viola (12)
 Charles Bowyer – additional vocals (3)
 Chyna Gordon – additional vocals (3)
 Marcia Johnson – additional vocals (3)
 Jackie Rawe – additional vocals (4, 10)
 The Strawberry Chorale – additional vocals (5)Production'''
 Cutting Crew – producers
 Peter-John Vettese – producer (1, 2, 3, 5-11)
 Don Gehman – producer (4)
 Curtis Schwartz – engineer, mixing (12)
 Hugh Padgham – mixing (1-11)
 Teo Miller – additional engineer 
 John Pennington – additional engineer 
 Matthew Ollivier – assistant engineer 
 Al Stone – mix assistant (1-11)
 The Town House (London, UK) – mixing location 
 Bob Ludwig – mastering at Masterdisk (New York City, New York, USA)
 Simon Hicks – A&R direction 
 Jody Sharp – A&R coordination
 Jeffrey Kent Ayeroff – art direction 
 Melanie Nissen – art direction 
 Mick Haggerty – design, cover photography 
 Simon Fowler – band photography 
 Jeb Hart – management 
 James Wylie – management

Charts

Album

Singles

References 

1989 albums
Cutting Crew albums
Albums produced by Don Gehman
Virgin Records albums